"Sucu Sucu" is a dance and a song written by Tarateño Rojas from Bolivia, who recorded his version in 1959. It became very popular in the 1960s and many singers and bands from all over the world made their own version of the song often in their own language. The song became even more popular worldwide once it was chosen to be the theme of Top Secret, a 1960s TV series, performed by Laurie Johnson and his orchestra. Diverse acts such as the Skatalites and Alberto Cortez did their own version of the song.

Different versions

Czechoslovakian version
Sláva Kunst Se Svým Orchestrem - Sucu Sucu

Danish version
John Hatting – Sucu Sucu
Posten Fra Ranum - Sucu Sucu

Dutch version
Eddy Christiani – Sucu Sucu (Mijn sombrero) (1961)

English versions
Harry Stoneham - Sucu Sucu (1970)
Nina & Frederik - Sucu Sucu (1961)
The Polka Dots - Sucu sucu (1961)

Finnish version
Brita Koivunen - Sucu Sucu (1961)
Kai Lind - Sucu Sucu (1961)
Seppo Pirhonen - Sucu Sucu (1961)
Iskelmälaulaja Arokanto Ja Viihdeorkesteri Tempo - Sucu Sucu (1983)

French/Arabic version
Bob Azzam / The Leiber-Stoller Big Band '60 - Sucu sucu

German versions
Die Amigos - Sucu Sucu
Victor Silvester and His Ballroom Orchestra - Sucu Sucu (1967)
Los Cucarachas - Sucu Sucu (1988)

Hindi version
 Shankar Jaikishan - Aiyayya karoon main kya Sucu Sucu, Film Junglee (1961)

Instrumental versions
Frits Stein - Sucu sucu
Laurie Johnson Orchestra - Sucu sucu (From TV Series "Top Secret")
Joe Loss - Sucu sucu
Eddie Calvert - Sucu Sucu (1965)
Sonora Palacio - El sucu sucu
James Wright and his orchestra - Sucu Sucu
Tono Quirazco - Sucu sucu
Poly e Seu Conjunto - Suco Suco (1961)

Italian version
Maja Brunner - Sucu sucu
Cristiano Malgioglio - Sucu sucu (2022)

Jamaican version
The Skatalites - Sucu Sucu (1980)

Japanese version
The Peanuts - Sucu Sucu (1961)

Latvian version
Andris Ērglis - Suku Suku (2016 Kuldīgas koncerts)

Norwegian versions
The Monn Keys - Sucu sucu (1961)
Banana Airlines - Sucu Sucu (1983)

Polish version
 Irena Santor - Sucu sucu (1963)

Russian version
 Evgeny Belyaev & Alexandrov Ensemble - Малыш (Kid) (1961, lyrics in Russian and Spanish)

Spanish versions
Ping Ping - Sucu sucu (1960)
Caterina Valente - Sucu Sucu (1960)
Tarateño Rojas - Sucu Sucu (1961)
Alberto Cortez / Hugo Diaz y su Conjunto from the Argentine National Ballet - Sucu sucu (1960)
Chico Del Rio / y su Combo - Sucu-Sucu (1961)
Belisario Lopez - El sucu sucu
Los Wawanco - El Baile Del Sucu Sucu
Los Prendados - Sucu sucu
Maria Zamora - Sucu sucu
Los Matecoco - Sucu sucu
Pilar Morales Y Conjunto De Fernando Orteu - Sucu sucu
Xavier Cugat - Sucu Sucu (1961)
Trio Guarania - Sucu Sucu (1969)
Eddy Christiani - Sucu, Sucu

Swedish versions
Cool Candys - Sucu, Sucu
Lars Lönndahl - Sucu, Sucu

Swiss versions
Hazy Osterwald - Sucu Sucu
Lys Assia - Sucu-Sucu (1961)

Yugoslavian versions
Ivo Robić - Suku Suku
Gabi Novak – Suku, Suku (1961)

References

1959 songs